The High Commissioner of Malaysia to the Republic of South Africa is the head of Malaysia's diplomatic mission to South Africa. The position has the rank and status of an Ambassador Extraordinary and Plenipotentiary and is based in the High Commission of Malaysia, Pretoria.

List of heads of mission

High Commissioners to South Africa

See also
 Malaysia–South Africa relations

References 

 
South Africa
Malaysia